The Piru Bay languages are a group of twenty Malayo-Polynesian languages, spoken on Ambon Island and around Piru Bay on the island of Seram, Indonesia. None of the languages have more than about twenty thousand speakers, and several are endangered with extinction.

Classification
The languages are as follows:

West Piru Bay (Seram and Ambon islands)
Asilulu
Hoamoal: Luhu (Piru), Manipa; Larike-Wakasihu, Boano
East Piru Bay
Sepa, Teluti
Solehua
Paulohi
Seram Straits
Kaibobo
Ambon: Hitu, Tulehu; Laha, Seit-Kaitetu
Uliase (Lease Islands)
Kamarian
Hatuhaha
Haruku
Saparuan
Elpaputi: Amahai, Nusa Laut
Saparua: Saparua, Latu

Many of the Piru Bay languages form a dialect continuum.

References

Languages of Indonesia
Central Maluku languages
Seram Island